Konstantin Shayne (born Konstantin Veniaminovich Olkenitski; , November 29, 1888 – November 15, 1974)  was a Russian-American actor.

Biography
Shayne was born in Kharkov, Russian Empire (now Kharkiv, Ukraine) to the family of Veniamin Olkenitsky-Nikulin, a Jewish actor. His siblings were actress Tamara Shayne and writers Lev and Yuriy Nikulin.

World War I intervened before he could join the Moscow Arts Theatre, and during the conflict he fought with General Wrangel and the White Armies. Shayne was married two times and he also had children.

Shayne emigrated to the United States in 1928, travelling as a second-class passenger on board the S/S Berengaria, which arrived at the Port of New York on September 14, 1928. He was listed as Konstantin Schein, an artist residing in Berlin, Germany.

As an actor, Shayne performed in movies such as None but the Lonely Heart (1944) and The Stranger (1946), starring (and directed by) Orson Welles. He performed in The Secret Life of Walter Mitty (1947), which featured Danny Kaye in the lead role. His performance in For Whom the Bell Tolls (1943) was cut from the final release.

In his penultimate film appearance Shayne dominates two minutes of Alfred Hitchcock's Vertigo (1958), playing the old bookseller Pop Leibel.

Filmography

Film

Select TV series
 Mr. & Mrs. North (1 episode, 1952) – Andre Stulik
 Alfred Hitchcock Presents (2 episodes, 1956–1958) – Abdul Ismael / Customs Officer
 The Outer Limits (2 episodes, 1963–1964) – Murdock – The Gardener / Dr. Philip Fletcher
 The Rogues (1 episode, 1965) – Commandant

References

External links
 
 

1888 births
1974 deaths
Actors from Kharkiv
Jewish Russian actors
Russian male film actors
White Russian emigrants to the United States